Triphorinae is an orchid subtribe in the tribe Triphoreae.

See also
 Taxonomy of the Orchidaceae

References

 
Orchid subtribes